The Telavi uezd was a county (uezd) of the Tiflis Governorate of the Caucasus Viceroyalty of the Russian Empire, and then of Democratic Republic of Georgia, with its administrative center in Telavi. The area of the county roughly corresponded to the contemporary Samtskhe-Javakheti region of Georgia.

History 
Following the Russian Revolution, the Telavi uezd was incorporated into the short-lived Democratic Republic of Georgia.

Administrative divisions 
The subcounties (uchastoks) of the Telavi uezd in 1913 were as follows:

Demographics

Russian Empire Census 
The majority of the population indicated Georgian to be their mother tongue, with a significant Armenian speaking minority.

Kavkazskiy kalendar 

See also 
 History of the administrative division of Russia

Notes

References

Bibliography 

 

Caucasus Viceroyalty (1801–1917)
Tiflis Governorate
Uezds of Tiflis Governorate
Modern history of Georgia (country)
1880 establishments in the Russian Empire
States and territories established in 1880
States and territories disestablished in 1918